Willard Parker (born Worster Van Eps; February 5, 1912 – December 4, 1996) was an American film and television actor. He was a leading man under contract to Columbia Pictures in the 1940s and starred in the TV series Tales of the Texas Rangers (1955–58).

Biography
Parker was born in New York City. Some sources reports his birth name as Worcester. He was a meter reader and a tennis pro. While working as the latter in Hollywood he was spotted by Zeppo Marx, then working as an agent. Marx arranged a screen test and he signed a contract with Warner Bros. He changed his name to "Willard Parker".

Warner Bros
Parker signed to Warner Bros in the late 1930s. He made his debut with an uncredited bit in the Dick Foran Western, The Devil's Saddle Legion (1937). He had small parts in That Certain Woman (1937) with Bette Davis; Back in Circulation (1937) with Pat O'Brien; The Radio Murder Mystery (1937) with Ronald Reagan; Alcatraz Island (1937) with John Litel; Over the Goal (1937) with June Travis; The Adventurous Blonde (1937) with Glenda Farrell; Missing Witness (1937) with Litel; and The Invisible Menace (1938) with Boris Karloff.

Parker's first notable film role was in A Slight Case of Murder (1938) with Edward G. Robinson. He followed it with Accidents Will Happen (1938) with Reagan, but then left the studio.

Parker went to Republic Pictures for The Zero Hour (1939). At Paramount he had a minor role in The Magnificent Fraud (1939).

Broadway
Parker decided to go to the stage to hone his acting skills. He worked for a stock company then tried Broadway, where he had a role in a hit play Johnny Belinda (1940) by Elmer Rice. He then replaced Victor Mature in the cast of the musical Lady in the Dark (1941) opposite Gertrude Lawrence. He went with the show when it toured on the road in 1943. This brought him to the attention of executives at Columbia Pictures who signed him to a long-term contract.

Columbia
Parker was the second male lead in What a Woman! (1943), a romantic comedy with Rosalind Russell and Brian Aherne.

His career was interrupted by service with the US Marines. Then when he returned Columbia promoted him to leading man status in the swashbuckler The Fighting Guardsman (1946). Then they starred him in a comedy One Way to Love (1946); and a Western, Renegades (1946).

These films were not particularly successful and Parker went back to being the third lead in Relentless (1948), a Western, and in The Mating of Millie (1948), he was billed after Glenn Ford, Evelyn Keyes and Ron Randell. Columbia tried him in the lead of a drama, The Wreck of the Hesperus (1948).

Universal borrowed him for a support role in You Gotta Stay Happy (1948) with Joan Fontaine and James Stewart. Back at Columbia he supported Don Ameche and Dorothy Lamour in the musical Slightly French (1949). Universal borrowed him for another support part, this time in the Yvonne De Carlo Western Calamity Jane and Sam Bass (1949).

Columbia gave him the lead in some "B"s, Bodyhold (1949), as a wrestler, with Lola Albright; and David Harding, Counterspy (1950), playing the title role. He played the third lead in the comedy Emergency Wedding (1950), supporting Larry Parks and Barbara Hale.

Parker went to Lippert Pictures to make Bandit Queen (1950), co-starring with Barbara Britton.

For RKO he did Hunt the Man Down (1951) then he made another for Columbia, My True Story (1951), playing the male lead under the direction of Mickey Rooney.

Universal used Parker as the third lead in the Western Apache Drums (1951). He had support roles in three films for Pine-Thomas Productions, Caribbean Gold (1952), Sangaree (1953) and The Vanquished (1953).  He guest-starred on TV in The Adventures of Ellery Queen (1952).

Parker returned to leads with the role of Jesse James in The Great Jesse James Raid (1953) for Lippert Pictures. He had a small role in Kiss Me Kate (1953)at MGM.

Television
Parker and his wife Virginia Field appeared in "Mr. And Mrs. Trubble" for Schlitz Playhouse (1952). That show invited him back for "Twenty-two Sycamore Road" (1953, with Nancy Reagan), "Little War at San Dede" (1954), and "Visitor in the Night" (1955).

He also guest-starred on Fireside Theatre in "A Mother's Duty" (1954) and "No Time for Susan" (1955, with his wife), and The Ford Television Theatre in "Kiss and Forget" (1953, with his wife), and "The Mumbys" (1955, with his wife). 
 
Parker was cast as Ranger Jace Pearson in the 52-episode CBS television series, Tales of the Texas Rangers, which aired from 1955 to 1958. His co-star was Harry Lauter as Ranger Clay Morgan. The series was rerun thereafter on ABC.

Parker starred in a low budget Western for Fox, Naked Gun (1956), and Lure of the Swamp (1957). He guest-starred in Lee Marvin's NBC crime drama, M Squad (1958) then starred in some low budget Westerns, Lone Texan (1959), Young Jesse James (1960) and Walk Tall (1960). He did "Dr Kate" for Westinghouse Desilu Playhouse (1960). Walk Tall was directed by Maury Dexter who used Parker in The High Powered Rifle (1961) and Air Patrol (1962).

Later career
He guest-starred in ABC's religion drama series, Going My Way, starring Gene Kelly and Leo G. Carroll as  Roman Catholic priests in New York City. Parker was cast as Msgr. Joe Giblin in the 1962 episode, "The Crooked Angel."

He had the lead in the British film The Earth Dies Screaming (1964) and was one of many names in Waco (1966).

His last film role was in The Great Waltz (1972).

Personal life
Parker was married to Marion Pierce from 1939 to 1951. They had one child. They were divorced and Parker was married to Virginia Field from 1951 until her death in 1992.

Parker died of a heart attack at the age of eighty-four in Rancho Mirage in Riverside County, California.

Partial filmography

The Devil's Saddle Legion (1937) - Hub Ordley
That Certain Woman (1937) - Reporter (uncredited)
Back in Circulation (1937) - Ben (uncredited)
Love Is on the Air (1937) - Les Quimby
Alcatraz Island (1937) - Reporter (uncredited)
Over the Goal (1937) - Duke Davis
The Adventurous Blonde (1937) - Clerk (uncredited)
Missing Witnesses (1937) - Hotel Clerk (uncredited)
The Invisible Menace (1938) - Pvt. Booker (uncredited)
A Slight Case of Murder (1938) - Dick Whitewood
Accidents Will Happen (1938) - Gas Station Attendant (uncredited)
The Zero Hour (1939) - Lansdowne
The Magnificent Fraud (1939) - Airline Steward (uncredited)
What a Woman! (1943) - Michael Cobb
The Fighting Guardsman (1946) - Baron Francois de St.-Hermain, alias Roland the Bandit
One Way to Love (1946) - Mitchell Raymond
Renegades (1946) - Dr. Sam Martin
The Wreck of the Hesperus (1948) - John Macready
Relentless (1948) - Jeff Moyer
The Mating of Millie (1948) - Phil Gowan
You Gotta Stay Happy (1948) - Henry Benson
Slightly French (1949) - Douglas Hyde
Calamity Jane and Sam Bass (1949) - Sheriff William 'Will' Egan
Bodyhold (1949) - Tommy Jones
The Secret Fury (1950) - Smith (uncredited)
David Harding, Counterspy (1950) - Lt. Comdr. Jerry A. Baldwin
Emergency Wedding (1950) - Vandemer
The Bandit Queen (1950) - Dan Hinsdale
Hunt the Man Down (1950) - Burnell 'Brick' Appleby
My True Story (1951) - Bill Phillips
Apache Drums (1951) - Mayor Joe Madden
Caribbean (1952) - Shively, MacAllister's Overseer
Sangaree (1953) - Gabriel Thatch
The Vanquished (1953) - Captain Kirby
The Great Jesse James Raid (1953) - Jesse James
Kiss Me Kate (1953) - Tex Callaway
Naked Gun (1956) - Breen Mathews
Lure of the Swamp (1957) - James Lister
Lone Texan (1959) - Clint Banister
Young Jesse James (1960) - Cole Younger
Walk Tall (1960) - Captain Ed Trask
The High Powered Rifle (1960) - Stephen Dancer
Air Patrol (1962) - Lt. Vern Taylor
The Earth Dies Screaming (1964) - Jeff Nolan
Waco (1966) - Pete Jenner (final film role)

References 

 Halliwell's Who's Who in the Movies, published by Harper-Collins, 
 The Film Encyclopedia by Ephraim Katz, published by Collins,

External links 
 
 

1912 births
1996 deaths
American male film actors
American male television actors
Male actors from New York City
Male actors from Los Angeles
People from Rancho Mirage, California
20th-century American male actors
Western (genre) television actors